"Ishare Tere" is a Punjabi song by Guru Randhawa and debutant Dhvani Bhanushali, which was released as a single by T-Series on 24 July 2018.

Music video 
Music video of the song was released on 24 July 2018 by T-Series on YouTube. It crossed 15 million views in 24 hours of its release. Song assisted by Vatsal Chevli @Headroom Studio. It is another hit song by Guru Randhawa and has crossed 600 million views.

Reception 
The song was well received by the audience and both singers were praised. Song was cited in media as Party anthem of the year. The Song reached No.3 On UK Asian Music Charts

References 

2018 singles
Punjabi-language songs
T-Series (company) singles
Dhvani Bhanushali songs
Guru Randhawa songs